Saskia Fischer (born 1966) is a German actress who began her career in 1991.
She is the daughter of Nicole Heesters and the granddaughter of famous actors Johannes Heesters and Louisa Ghijs. Fischer has lived since 2002 with actor Mario Ramos in Hamburg with whom she has a son.

Filmography
 1991: Altes Herz wieder jung
 1993: Sylter Geschichten
 2001: Wilsberg – Wilsberg und der Schuss im Morgengrauen
 2002: Schlosshotel Orth
 2002: Broti & Pacek – Irgendwas ist immer
 2002–2008: Tatort
 2003: Doppelter Einsatz – Heiße Fracht
 2003: Traumprinz in Farbe
 2005: Die unlösbaren Fälle des Herrn Sand
 2006: Meine Mutter tanzend
 2006: Paulas Sommer
 2007: Küstenwache
 2007: Ein Fall für zwei
 2007– : Großstadtrevier
 2008: Da kommt Kalle
 2009: Fünf Tage Vollmond

External links

German film actresses
German people of Dutch descent
German people of Belgian descent
1961 births
Living people
20th-century German actresses
21st-century German actresses